This is a subarticle to tafsir and ulama

This is a list of important Quran interpreters

Quran interpreters

A
Abd al-Qahir al-Jurjani
Abd al-Rahman al-Tha'alibi
Abdelhamid Ben Badis
Abdul Aziz al-Harbi
Abdul Hakim Sialkoti
Abdul Karim Mudarris
Abdul Majid Daryabadi
Abdul Mannan Wazirabadi
Abdullah Yusuf Ali
Abdurrahman Shihab
Abu Abd al-Rahman Ibn Aqil al-Zahiri
Abu al-Barakat al-Nasafi
Abu al-Futuh al-Razi
Abu al-Layth al-Samarqandi
Abu Bakr ibn al-Arabi
Abu Hanifa
Abu Hayyan al-Gharnati
Abu Ishaq al-Tha'labi
Abu Jaʿfar an-Nahhas
Abu Mansur al-Maturidi
Abu Ubaid al-Qasim bin Salam
Abul A'la Maududi
Ahmad ibn Ajiba
Akmal al-Din al-Babarti
Al-Ash'ari
Al-Baghawi
Al-Bazdawi
Al-Farraʼ
Al-Jarmi
Al-Khatib al-Shirbini
Al-Mahalli
Al-Mubarrad
Al-Qassab
Al-Qurtubi
Al-Raghib al-Isfahani
Al-Sakhawi
Al-Shawkani
Al-Suyuti
Al-Tabari
Al-Zamakhshari
'Ala' al-Din al-Bukhari
Amin Ahsan Islahi
Ashraf Ali Thanwi

B
Bouguerra Soltani

E
Ebussuud Efendi

F
Fairuzabadi
Fakhr al-Din al-Razi
Fethullah Gülen

G
Gabriel Said Reynolds

H
Hamiduddin Farahi
Hartwig Hirschfeld

I
Ibn Abbas
Ibn Abidin
Ibn al-Jawzi
Ibn al-Mundhir
Ibn Barrajan
Ibn Duraid
Ibn Furak
Ibn Juzayy
Ibn Khalawayh
Ibn Kathir
Ibn Wahb
Ishaq ibn Rahwayh
Ismail Haqqi Bursevi
Israr Ahmed

J
Jalal al-Din Davani
Jana Begum
Javed Ahmad Ghamidi

K
Karam Shah al-Azhari
Khalil (scholar)
Kirmani

M
Mahmud al-Alusi
Mahmud Hasan Deobandi
Mohammad Amin Sheikho
Muhammad Abdullah Draz
Muhammad Abu Zahra
Muhammad al-Tahir ibn Ashur
Muhammad Ali al-Sabuni
Muhammad Amjad
Muhammed Hamdi Yazır
Muhammad Hashim Thattvi
Muhammad Husayn Tabatabai
Muhammad Ibn Ibrahim Ibn Jafar al-Numani
Muhammad Ibrahim Mir Sialkoti
Muhammad Madni Ashraf Ashrafi Al-Jilani
Muhammad Metwalli al-Sha'rawi
Muhammad Quraish Shihab
Muhammad Shafi Deobandi
Muhammad Sulaiman Salman Mansoorpuri
Mujahid ibn Jabr
Muqatil ibn Sulayman
Murtada Sharif 'Askari

N
Naeem-ud-Deen Muradabadi
Nizam al-Din al-Nisapuri
Nurettin Uzunoğlu

Q
Qadi Baydawi

R
Rashad Khalifa
Rashid Rida
Reuven Firestone

S
Saʽid Ḥawwa
Sa'id ibn Mansur
Sadr al-Shari'a al-Asghar
Said Nursî
Sanaullah Amritsari
Sanaullah Panipati
Sayyid Qutb
Shabbir Ahmad Usmani
Shah Ahmad Noorani
Shams al-Din al-Fanari
Shihab al-Din al-Khafaji
Sidi Boushaki
Sufyan al-Thawri

T
Taqi Usmani
Taqi al-Din al-Subki

U
Ubadah ibn al-Samit

W
Wahbah al-Zuhayli

Y
Yousef Casewit

See also
List of tafsir works

References

 
Quran interpreters
Sunni tafsir
 
Quranic exegesis
Quranic readings